The Greater Western Library Alliance (GWLA) is a library consortium of 39 research libraries located across the United States.

Current members

Arizona State University
Baylor University
Brigham Young University
The Claremont Colleges
Colorado State University
Iowa State University
Kansas State University
Oklahoma State University
Oregon State University
Rice University
Southern Illinois University, Carbondale
Southern Methodist University
Texas A&M University
Texas State University
Texas Tech University
University of Arizona
University of Arkansas
University of Colorado
University of Delaware
University of Denver
University of Hawaiʻi at Mānoa
University of Houston
University of Illinois, Chicago
University of Kansas
University of Missouri
University of Nevada, Las Vegas
University of New Mexico
University of Oklahoma
University of Oregon
University of Southern California
University of Texas
University of Utah
University of Washington
University of Wyoming
Utah State University
Washington State University
Washington University in St. Louis
Wayne State University
West Virginia University

Projects and Associated Organizations
Occam's Reader. In February 2014, it was announced that GWLA, along with development partners Texas Tech University and University of Hawaiʻi at Mānoa, had entered into an agreement with Springer Science+Business to do a year-long pilot test of the eBook interlibrary loan software Occam's Reader.
Western Waters Digital Library. In 2004, the Western Waters Digital Library was begun as a collaborative regional project by twelve research libraries under the auspices of the Greater Western Library Alliance (GWLA). Since its inception, an additional 18 institutions have joined the project.
BioOne. The Greater Western Library Alliance was one of five collaborating institutions which founded BioOne, a not-for-profit collaborative created to address inequities in STM publishing. BioOne was founded in 2001.

Media outlets and social networking
In addition to the official website, GWLA has a presence on Facebook. An occasional newsletter is also issued, and an archive is available.

References

External links

Cooperatives in the United States
Library-related organizations